Marilyn R. Rosenberg (b. 1934 Philadelphia, Pennsylvania) is an American book artist and visual poet. She studied at the State University of New York and New York University.

Her work is in the collection of the Center for Book Arts, the Harvard Fine Arts Library, the Lomholt Mail Art Archive,  as well as the National Museum of Women in the Arts.

References

External links
Books as Art, Books as Sculpture, Sculpture as a Poem: Marilyn R. Rosenberg Interviewed by Nance Van Winckel

1934 births
Living people
People from Philadelphia
Women book artists
Book artists
20th-century American women artists
Visual poets